Constantin Marius Măldărășanu (born 19 April 1975) is a Romanian football manager and former player, who is currently in charge of Liga I club FC Hermannstadt.

Club career
Măldărășanu started his career playing for Petrolul Ploieşti in 1996, moving to Rapid București in 1998. Măldărăşanu joined Turkish side Beşiktaş during the 2002 season, only to return in 2003. In January 2008, after a conflict with coach Mircea Rednic, Măldărăşanu was released from his contract. Soon after he signed a contract with FC Brașov.

International career
Marius Măldărăşanu has been capped 8 times for Romania, making his debut under coach Emerich Jenei on 2 February 2000, in a friendly which ended with a 2–0 victory against Latvia. He also played in a 2006 World Cup qualification match against Armenia which ended 1–1. Măldărăşanu's last appearance for the national team was on 15 November 2006 in Cádiz in a friendly against Spain which ended with a 1–0 victory.

International stats

Managerial statistics

Honours

Player
Rapid București
Divizia A: 1998–99, 2002–03
Cupa României: 2001–02, 2005–06, 2006–07
Supercupa României: 1999, 2002, 2003, 2007
Beşiktaş
Süper Lig: 2002–03
FC Braşov
Liga II: 2007–08

References

External links

1975 births
Living people
Sportspeople from Ploiești
Romanian footballers
Association football midfielders
FC Petrolul Ploiești players
FC Rapid București players
FC Brașov (1936) players
Beşiktaş J.K. footballers
Romania international footballers
Romanian expatriate footballers
Süper Lig players
Liga I players
Liga II players
Expatriate footballers in Turkey
Romanian expatriate sportspeople in Turkey
Romanian football managers
FC Astra Giurgiu managers
FC Metaloglobus București managers
FC Hermannstadt managers
Liga I managers
Liga II managers